Dunstan Daniel Mkapa (born 20 September 1948) has been a Tanzanian CCM politician and Member of Parliament for Nanyumbu constituency since 2005.

References

1948 births
Living people
Chama Cha Mapinduzi MPs
Tanzanian MPs 2005–2010
Tanzanian MPs 2010–2015
Lindi Secondary School alumni
College of Business Education alumni